Macna platychloralis is a species of snout moth in the genus Macna. It was described by Francis Walker in 1866. It is found on Java.

References

Moths described in 1866
Pyralini